The R365 road, also called the Mountbellew Bypass, is a regional road in Ireland, located in County Galway.

References

Regional roads in the Republic of Ireland
Roads in County Galway